Joan is an American duo from Little Rock, Arkansas, consisting of Alan Benjamin Thomas and Steven Rutherford.

History
The duo formed in 2017. The duo released their first EP in 2019, titled portra. The duo released their second EP in 2020 titled cloudy. In May 2021, the duo released a new song titled "so good" as well as plans to release two EPs the same year. The two EPs, hi and bye, were released in late 2021.

Discography
EPs
portra (2019)
cloudy (2020)
hi (2021)
bye (2021)

References

American musical duos
Musical groups from Little Rock, Arkansas